Elections to Kesteven County Council were held on Saturday, 2 April 1955. Kesteven was one of three divisions of the historic county of Lincolnshire in England; it consisted of the ancient wapentakes (or hundreds) of Aswardhurn, Aveland, Beltisloe, Boothby Graffoe, Flaxwell, Langoe, Loveden, Ness, and Winnibriggs and Threo. The Local Government Act 1888 established Kesteven as an administrative county, governed by a Council; elections were held every three years from 1889, until it was abolished by the Local Government Act 1972, which established Lincolnshire County Council in its place.

The County Council was divided into 60 electoral divisions. 45 independents and 15 Labour candidates were returned in the 1961 elections.

Results by division

References

Notes

Citations

1955
1955 English local elections
April 1955 events in the United Kingdom
20th century in Lincolnshire